Eriophorum viridicarinatum is a species of sedge known by the common names thinleaf cottonsedge, green-keeled cottongrass, and bog cottongrass. It is native to northern North America, where it occurs in Alaska and throughout much of Canada, its range extending into the northern contiguous United States. Its distribution is more patchy in the west but it is widespread in eastern Canada.

This perennial sedge forms tufts of stiff, erect stems, sometimes just a single stem, and basal leaves up to 30 centimeters long. It grows from a rhizome. The inflorescence is accompanied by two to four leaflike bracts each a few centimeters long. There are up to 30 spikelets, increasing in size as the fruit develops, reaching 3 centimeters in length. Each flower has a tuft of white or brown bristles that are long and cottony, measuring up to 2.5 centimeters long.

This plant grows at high latitudes and high elevations, in cold, wet habitat types such as sphagnum bogs and tundra overlying permafrost. It is stimulated to grow in the spring when the thaw begins to increase moisture in the environment.

References

External links
USDA Plants Profile

viridicarinatum
Plants described in 1905